Borrelia sinica is a spirochete bacterium. Its cells contain only four periplasmic flagella inserted at each end of the spirochaetes, differing from other Borrelia species. It is associated with Lyme disease. CMN3T is the type strain of this species.

References

Further reading

External links 
NCBI Taxonomy Browser - Borrelia

LPSN

sinica
Bacteria described in 2001